Anabalaya Films is an Indian film production and distribution company headed by K. Prabhakaran.

History 
The studio is led by K. Prabhakaran, who later adopted the stage name Anbalaya Prabhakaran. In the 1990s the studio specialized in making low budget Tamil films with upcoming directors. Some of the directors that the studio introduced include Agathiyan and Prabhu Solomon. In addition to producing, Prabhakaran also acted in his productions, mostly portraying negative roles.

In the early 2000s, Prabhakaran signed on Arjun Sarja to work on a film for the studio. The duo initially planned to team up for a film titled Chanakya to be directed by Shaji Kailas, but later dropped the plan. Subsequently, Arjun directed and starred in Parasuram (2003).

In 2004, the studio made a comeback by producing the college drama Pazhaniappa Kalloori (2007) starring Naveen Chandra, Arjumman Mughal, Madhu Shalini and Akshaya Rao.

Later Prabhakaran began working as an actor and appeared in character roles. He also became actively involved in the Tamil Film Producers Council.

Filmography

References 

Film distributors of India
Film production companies based in Chennai
Indian film studios
1987 establishments in Tamil Nadu
Mass media companies established in 1987
Indian companies established in 1987